Azza El Hassan, born April 21, 1971, in Amman, Jordan is a Palestinian documentary filmmaker, cinematographer, producer and writer. Her documentary films mostly reflect her experience living in exile and her experience living in Palestine. One of her best known works is Zaman al-akhbar (2001).

Early life and education 
El-Hassan was born April 21, 1971, in Amman, Jordon where her parents, originally from Palestine, lived in exile. In September of that year, her family moved to Beirut, Lebanon, due to the aftermath of Black September. Living in Beirut was a difficult time for the family because Lebanon was also suffering from a civil war. She attended school in Beirut when the situation allowed it. She also volunteered in hospitals and did a lot of work when the days there were very tough. At the age of eleven, her family moved back to Amman because of the war conditions in Beirut. The tragedy and war going on around her left a massive mark in her mind, and would later have an impact on her work.

After high school, El-Hassan made the decision to study filmmaking and sociology between the years 1989 and 1993, a decision her parents were strongly against. She then went on to graduate from London University Goldsmith College in 1996 with an M.A in film and television documentary.

Career 
After her graduation, El-Hassan moved to Ramallah, Palestine and started her career in documentary film making. As a child of Palestinian parents, she needed find that part of herself due to the fact she lived in exile most of her life. Most of her work has focused on Palestinians who were born either in exile or in Palestine.

She would turn on her camera and film people that were shot, film them being taken to the hospital, and film their families as they buried them. At the start of her career, she would document the space she lived in and the emotion of each disaster she filmed. She started to notice that her documentaries resemble that of journalists and she wanted to change that because journalists only show the tragedy of the situation and never what people are making of the situation.

Maysun wa Majida (Arab Women Speak Out, 1997) 
In this film, El-Hassan portraits two women, Maysun and Majida. Maysun is strongly against her father who is forcing her to marry at the age of sixteen. Her father is physically abusive towards her, which she endured while she is in school.  When she is in university she falls in love with a man who is from the same village as her, named Nafez, and marries him against his families wishes. Nafez's family rejects her because she is a fairly educated woman; now Maysun and Nafez are still married with five children. 

In the second story is about Majida who is struggling against Israeli occupation.  While pregnant she is arrested, tortured and threatened to be raped by Israeli soldiers.  After her imprisonment her husband divorces her because he considers imprisonment an act of dishonour.  She is then shown to be married for the second time and to be empowering women she they can be aware of their rights and what they are capable of.

Koushan Mousa (Title Deeds from Moses, 1998) 
Koushan Mousa (1998) is a film about the settlement policies in Israel. The filmmakers are witnessing the Israel occupied territories, with their cameras, after the Six Day War which was in 1967. They start their trip at the western edge of the Arab East Jerusalem, Ma'aleh Adumim.  Israel plans to expand their settlement onto Palestinian villages, plans that would kill people and ruin their homes.  The Israeli people claim that God promised them this land long ago so it is now their right to take it from the Palestinians and ruin five of their villages.

Zaman al-akhbar (News Time, 2001) 
Zaman al-akhbar is said to be one of her well known films. Whenever El-Hassan is trying to document her new film she is told that people do not need to see films, they need to be informed about the news.  "Shot during the first few months of the second intifada, El-Hassan takes pictures of the dreary everyday life in Ramallah." She wanted to put picture side by side from the news and her filming to show that although there is destruction there is also so much love people have towards each other, there are also people out there making most of their situation.  Although the situation being shown is tragic, she wants this film to reflect the pain people are suffering through and also their delightful moments.

Filmography

Awards and nominations

 In 1999 her film Kousha Mousa (Title Deed from Moses) won the Best Documentary Film at the Independent Film Festival in London
 In 1999 her film Kousha Mousa (Title Deed from Moses) was nominated for the Ogawa Shinuske Prize at the Yamagata International Documentary Film Festival
 In 2001 her film Zaman al-akhbat (News Time) won the Grierson Award for the Best Newcomer Film at the Jury Special Award at the Arab Screen Independent Film Festival
 In 2001 her film Zaman al-akhbat (News Time) was nominated for the Ogawa Shinsuke Prize at the Yamagata International Documentary Film Festival

References

External links 
 
 Azza El-Hassan in Columbia University for Palestine Studies
Azza El-Hassan in The Electronic Intifada

Further reading 
 The Effect of Violence
 Shifting Roles

1971 births
Living people
Jordanian writers
Palestinian documentary filmmakers
People from Amman